Rubén Alejandro Botta Montero (born 31 January 1990) is an Argentine footballer who plays as an attacking midfielder for Italian  club Bari.

Career
Rubén Botta made his league debut for Tigre in a 0–0 draw with Boca Juniors on 23 March 2009, at the age of 19. He only played one further game in the 2009 Clausura before being loaned for half a season Latvian Higher League side FK Ventspils, where he did not play in any games. In 2010, he returned to Tigre and begun to make more regular appearances for the club. On 13 November, he came to widespread attention in a 2–1 win against league leaders Estudiantes de la Plata, in which he assisted for Tigre's second goal and nearly scored a third after a display of individual skill.

In April 2013, he signed for Serie A club Internazionale, despite he would join A.S. Livorno Calcio first. Botta failed to obtain Italian citizenship, thus Inter bought the non-EU registration quota from Livorno . In January 2014 Botta formally became a player of Inter. On 7 July 2015 Botta agreed to join Mexican side C.F. Pachuca.

Style of play
Botta primarily plays as an attacking midfielder. He is left-footed.

Career statistics

Club

Honours
Pachuca
 Liga MX: Clausura 2016

Bari
 Serie C: 2021–22 (Group C)

References

External links
 
 
  

1990 births
Living people
People from San Juan, Argentina
Argentine footballers
Association football midfielders
Argentine Primera División players
Boca Juniors footballers
Club Atlético Tigre footballers
San Lorenzo de Almagro footballers
Defensa y Justicia footballers
Serie A players
Serie B players
Serie C players
Inter Milan players
A.C. ChievoVerona players
A.S. Sambenedettese players
S.S.C. Bari players
Liga MX players
C.F. Pachuca players
Argentine expatriate footballers
Argentine expatriate sportspeople in Italy
Argentine expatriate sportspeople in Mexico
Expatriate footballers in Italy
Expatriate footballers in Mexico
Sportspeople from San Juan Province, Argentina